Bauta Stone is a 1972 concrete sculpture by Randi A. Bjorge, installed in Salt Lake City's Jordan Park, in the U.S. state of Utah. The stele measures approximately 20 ft. x 35 in. x 16 in. and displays Norwegian symbols.

References

1972 sculptures
Concrete sculptures in the United States
Outdoor sculptures in Salt Lake City